Mohammad Reza Khorsandnia is an Iranian professional footballer. He currently plays for Aboumoslem in Iran Pro League.

Career
Khorsandnia started his career at Aboumoslem in 2005. After the club's relegation to the Azadegan League, Khorsandnia transferred  to Paykan. In 2012, Khorsandnia was acquired by newly promoted team Gahar Zagros He signed with Esteghlal in the summer of 2014.

1 Statistics Incomplete.

References

External sources
 Profile at Persianleague
 

Living people
Iranian footballers
F.C. Aboomoslem players
Gahar Zagros players
Paykan F.C. players
Shahr Khodro F.C. players
Esteghlal F.C. players
1988 births
Association football midfielders